Bronchocela celebensis, the Sulawesi bloodsucker, is a species of lizard. It is endemic to Indonesia. It is closely related to Bronchocela jubata and other lizards of the Bronchocela genus.

References

Bronchocela
Reptiles described in 1845
Taxa named by John Edward Gray
Reptiles of Sulawesi